Matt Graham (born 23 October 1994) is an Australian freestyle skier. He was a finalist at the 2014 Winter Olympics in Sochi, Russia.
At the Pyeongchang Olympics in 2018, he won silver in men's moguls. This is the 13th medal for Australia at the Winter Olympics and the 8th in freestyle skiing.

Career
Graham joined the Perisher Winter Sports Club mogul program at the age of six, and he has been skiing ever since. Some of his major achievements so far include:

 Graham first made his mark on the world stage as a 15-year-old, placing 27th in his debut in the final World Cup qualification event prior to the Vancouver 2010 Olympic Winter Games.
 In 2013 he achieved fourth place at this first World Championships in Voss, Norway.
 Also in 2013, he finished seventh at the Sochi Olympic test World Cup event.
 At the Sochi Olympics in 2014, Graham placed seventh in the finals of the men's moguls.

Graham is a graduate of the Central Coast Grammar School, and he has maintained his ties with the school since graduating. He is studying towards his Bachelor of Engineering (Civil) and Bachelor of Business at the University of Newcastle.

References

External links

1994 births
Freestyle skiers at the 2014 Winter Olympics
Freestyle skiers at the 2018 Winter Olympics
Freestyle skiers at the 2022 Winter Olympics
Living people
Olympic freestyle skiers of Australia
Australian male freestyle skiers
People from Gosford
Olympic silver medalists for Australia
Olympic medalists in freestyle skiing
Medalists at the 2018 Winter Olympics
Sportsmen from New South Wales